Henri Hens (6 December 1889 – 20 February 1963) was a Belgian cyclist. In 1910 he won the national and world championships in motor-paced racing.

References

1889 births
1963 deaths
Belgian male cyclists
Cyclists from Antwerp